Tapan Kumar Sen is a politician from the Communist Party of India (Marxist) and a Member of the Parliament of India representing West Bengal in the Rajya Sabha, the upper house of the Indian Parliament.

References

External links
 Profile on Rajya Sabha website

Living people
Communist Party of India (Marxist) politicians from West Bengal
Rajya Sabha members from West Bengal
1951 births
Politicians from Kolkata
University of Calcutta alumni